Following his death in a flight destined to help the victims of the 1972 Nicaragua earthquake, former baseball player Roberto Clemente received several posthumous awards and homages, eventually becoming the athlete with most statues and monuments dedicated to him in the world. 

In addition to this, during his Major League Baseball (MLB) career he won recognition for his on field performance including the 1966 National League (NL) Most Valuable Player (MVP) Award.

Posthumous accolades

Awards

 Havey Boyle Award (1961) from the Pittsburgh chapter of the Baseball Writers' Association of America.
 Sportsman of the Year Award (1961, 1966 and 1971) from the Pittsburgh Post-Gazette Dapper Dan Club.
 Man of the Year Award (1966) from the Pittsburgh chapter of the United States Junior Chamber, also known as the Jaycees.
 David L. Lawrence Memorial Award (1966) from the Pittsburgh chapter of the Jaycees.
 Tris Speaker Memorial Award (1970) from the Houston chapter of the Baseball Writers' Association of America. 
 Babe Ruth Award (1971) from the Baseball Writers' Association of America (BBWWA).
 Al Abrams Memorial Award (1986) from the Pittsburgh Post-Gazette Dapper Dan Club.
 Eduardo Green Award (1989) from the government of Nicaragua.

Honors

 Clemente's uniform number 21 was retired by the Pirates on April 6, 1973.
 The United States Postal Service issued a Roberto Clemente postal stamp on August 17, 1984. The stamp was designed by Juan Lopez-Bonilla and shows Clemente wearing a Pittsburgh Pirates baseball cap with a Puerto Rican flag in the background.
 A US Post Office in Clemente's hometown, Carolina, Puerto Rico, was named after him by congress on October 10, 2003.
The Pirates originally erected a statue in memory of Clemente at Three Rivers Stadium, an honor previously awarded to Honus Wagner. The statue was moved to PNC Park when it opened. An identical smaller statue was unveiled in Newark, New Jersey's Branch Brook Park in 2012.
The Park and statue are near the Roberto Clemente Bridge, which carries Sixth Street and was named in his honor.   The team considered naming PNC Park after Clemente. Despite popular sentiment, the team sold the naming rights to locally based PNC Financial Services. The bridge was named for Clemente as a local compromise.
 The coliseum in San Juan, Puerto Rico was named the Roberto Clemente Coliseum in 1973; two baseball parks are in Carolina: the professional one is named Roberto Clemente Stadium for him; the other is a Double-A. The Escuela de los Deportes (School of Sports) has the Double-A baseball park. Today, this sports complex is called Ciudad Deportiva Roberto Clemente. Because of Clemente, the Pittsburgh Pirates have continued as one of the most popular baseball teams in Puerto Rico.
 The City of Pittsburgh maintains Roberto Clemente Memorial Park along North Shore Drive on the city's North Side. It includes a bronze relief by sculptor Eleanor Milleville. 
In 2007, the Roberto Clemente Museum opened in the Lawrenceville section of Pittsburgh. 
Near the old Forbes Field where Clemente began his pro career, the city of Pittsburgh renamed a street in his honor.
 Thoroughbred racehorse Roberto, bred in 1968 and owned by John W. Galbreath, then the Pirates owner, was named for Clemente. The horse became a champion in Britain and Ireland. In June 1973, after Clemente's death, he won the Group I Coronation Stakes at Epsom.
 The U.S. state of New York in 1973 renamed Harlem River State Park in The Bronx as Roberto Clemente State Park. A statue of the Hall of Fame icon, sculpted by Cuban-American Maritza Hernandez, was installed at the park in June 2013. It depicts Clemente doffing his cap after notching his 3,000th hit on September 30, 1972.
 In Brentwood, Suffolk County, New York, Timberline town park and pool was renamed as Roberto Clemente Park in 2011.
 Roberto Clemente Stadium in Masaya, Nicaragua was named for him.
 The Roberto Clemente Little League in Branch Brook Park in Newark, New Jersey is named for him.
 During the 2003 and 2004 MLB seasons, the Montreal Expos (who at the time were owned by MLB) played 22 home games each season at Hiram Bithorn Stadium in San Juan, Puerto Rico. Although the Pirates played their annual road series against the Expos in Montreal for 2003, the two teams did meet in San Juan for a four-game series in 2004. It was the last series the Expos hosted there before moving to Washington, D.C. and becoming the Washington Nationals the following season. During one of those games, in a tribute to Clemente, both teams wore throwback uniforms from the 1969 season this was the Expos' first season and Clemente's 15th with the Pirates. 

 Clemente's #21 remains active in MLB and is worn by multiple players. Sammy Sosa wore #21 throughout his career as a tribute to his childhood hero. The number is unofficially retired in the Puerto Rico Baseball League. While the topic of retiring #21 throughout Major League Baseball, as was done with Jackie Robinson's #42, has been broached and supported by groups such as Hispanics Across America. Sharon Robinson disagrees, believing that her father's honor should be his alone and that MLB should honor Clemente in another way.
 In 2012, the Puerto Rican Professional Baseball League renamed itself Liga de Béisbol Profesional Roberto Clemente in his honor.
 At Pirate City, the Pirates spring training home in Bradenton, Florida, a section of 27th Street East is named Roberto Clemente Memorial Highway.
 On April 27, 2018, the portion of Route 21 between mileposts 3.90 and 5.83 in Newark, New Jersey was dedicated the "Roberto Clemente Memorial Highway" in his honor.
 In July 2018, the asteroid 109330 Clemente was named in his honor. 
 Roberto Clemente Park is a neighborhood park located near downtown Miami, Florida; it has a ball field, community center, playground and basketball courts. 101 NW 34th St, Miami, FL 33127
The Pittsburgh Pirates took #21 out of retirement for a game against the Chicago White Sox at PNC Park on September 9, 2020. The MLB has celebrated the date as "Roberto Clemente Day" since 2002, and all members of the Pittsburgh team were to wear #21.
 The Fort Buchanan Fitness Center annex in Puerto Rico was dedicated to Roberto Clemente on January 15, 2021.
 The US Post Office serving the Logan Square neighborhood of Chicago is named in honor of Roberto Clemente.
In Boston, Massachusetts a baseball diamond in the Back Bay Fens was rededicated as Roberto Clemente Field in the 1970s and feature a cast stone monument with a bronze relief of likeness and plaque in his honor.

Halls of fame

 Baseball Hall of Fame; March 20, 1973.
 World Sports Humanitarian Hall; 1995. 
 United States Marine Corps Sports Hall of Fame; 2003.
 Hispanic Heritage Baseball Museum Hall of Fame; 2010.
 Caribbean Baseball Hall of Fame; 2015.
 Puerto Rican Veterans Hall of Fame; 2018.

Schools
 Roberto Clemente Middle School in Orlando, Florida, which features a mural painted by Neysa Milan.
 Roberto Clemente Community Academy in Chicago
 Roberto Clemente Charter School in Allentown, Pennsylvania
 Roberto Clemente Academy in Detroit
 Roberto Clemente Elementary School in Paterson, New Jersey
 Roberto Clemente Middle School in Paterson, New Jersey
 Roberto W. Clemente Middle School in Germantown, Maryland
 Roberto Clemente Intermediate School (IS 195) in New York City
 Clemente Leadership Academy in The Hill neighborhood of New Haven, Connecticut.
 Roberto Clemente School No. 8 is an elementary school in Rochester, New York

Government recognitions
Clemente has posthumously presented three civilian awards of the United States government from the President of the United States including the first Presidential Citizens Medal:
 President Richard Nixon, May 14, 1973: Roberto Clemente Walker Congressional Gold Medal
 President Richard Nixon, May 14, 1973: Presidential Citizens Medal
 President George W. Bush, July 23, 2003: Presidential Medal of Freedom

Citizens Medal Citation
"All who saw Roberto Clemente in action, whether on the diamond or on the front lines of charitable endeavor, are richer for the experience. He stands with the handful of men whose brilliance has transformed the game of baseball into a showcase of skill and spirit, giving universal delight and inspiration. More than that, his selfless dedication to helping those with two strikes against them in life has blessed thousands and set an example for millions. As long as athletes and humanitarians are honored, Roberto Clemente's memory will live; as long as Citizens Medals are presented, each will mean a little more because the first one went to him."

National Hero of Puerto Rico

In 2022, the government of Puerto Rico granted Clemente the formal recognition of prócer (national hero).

References
Footnotes

Notes

Clemente, Roberto
Awards